The waxworks museum of the Castle of Diósgyőr is a waxworks museum, one of the largest ones in Central Europe. It is situated in the northeastern tower of the Castle of Diósgyőr, in Miskolc-Diósgyőr, Hungary.

Most of the wax figures can be seen in the rondella of the tower, in six scenes:

 Everyday life in mediaeval Diósgyőr with ten wax figures.
 Knights' tournament with ten wax figures.
 Mediaeval fair with fourteen wax figures.
 George Magyar (Georgius Ungarus) in hell: According to a legend well known in the Middle Ages (but generally unknown today and usually told by a tourist guide in the wax museum), George was a knight in the army of Louis I. During a campaign in Italy he massacred innocent civilians, and as a penitence he was sent on a pilgrimage to the St Patrick's Purgatory in Ireland, which was believed to be the entrance to Hell. He survived it, and because of this later he was thought to be a holy man. Among the fourteen wax figures we can see him with the priests, the massacred people and the demons of his visions.
 King Louis grants a coat of arms to Kassa: Kassa (today: Košice, Slovakia) was granted a coat of arms by Louis the Great in 1369. It was the first time in history that a city got a coat of arms. The ten wax figures portray the king, his queen, the envoy from Košice (Kassa) and several courtiers (See: Coat of arms of Košice).
 The court of Louis the Great: The wax figure of Louis the Great sits enthroned among six courtiers.

Besides the waxworks museum in the rondella, there is a smaller waxworks scene on the 2nd floor of the northeastern tower, commemorating the peace treaty of Turin (1381). (The peace negotiations were held in Turin, but the king couldn't travel because of his severe illness – he was already suffering from leprosy –, so he signed the documents in this room.) The treaty compelled the city of Venice to pay a yearly tribute of 7000 golden Forints to the king. (At that time the royal treasury had a yearly income of 15.000 Fts.) Venice also had to raise the Angevin flag on St. Mark's Square on holy days. (The peace treaty expired with the death of King Louis one year later.) The eight wax figures portray the king with courtiers and the Venetian envoy.

On the first floor of the tower a museum commemorates the Pauline monastery of Diósgyőr. It features the life-size wax figure of a Pauline monk.

References

External links
 Official site of the castle
 "Castle of Queens" - Diósgyőr

Museums in Miskolc
Wax museums